Red Bull Flugtag ('airshow' ) is an event organized by Red Bull in which competitors attempt to fly home-made, human-powered flying machines, size-limited to around  and weight-limited to approximately . Most competitors enter for the entertainment value, and the flying machines rarely fly at all.

Background
The format was originally invented in Selsey, a small seaside town in the south of England under the name "Birdman Rally" in 1971. The first Red Bull Flugtag competition was held in 1992 in Vienna, Austria. It was such a success that it has been held every year since and in over 35 cities all over the world.

Anyone is eligible to compete in the Flugtag event. To participate, each team must submit an application and their contraption must meet the criteria set forth by Red Bull. The criteria vary with location. The craft must be powered by muscle, gravity, and imagination. Because the aircraft will ultimately end up in the water, it must be unsinkable and constructed entirely of environmentally friendly materials.

Teams
Die Flügelmütter with the object Flying Puch Maxi

On September 26, 2021 the Red Bull Flugtag returned to Vienna where the ever first event was held in 1992. The moped enthusiasts built a Puch Maxi scaled 3:1. The crowd and jury was overwhelmed from the detailed rebuilt.
They won the event with 110 overall points. The insane jump from the pilot "TheRealRibens" wrot austrian history. The construction phase took the crew (Tschesn King, Banbana, Dax) three weeks of hard work. Most of the parts were built with wood, carton and paper.

Bee Maja with the object Die Bienenweide

Team Bee Maja entered the competition as the only Team from Vorarlberg. With their floatplane, completely built from wood and dedicated to a sustainable revolution in the flight industry they managed to fly a distance over 10m, only two meters shy of the winning team’s record. With a total of 96 points they fell only a few points short of a podiums placement.

Teams that enter the competition are judged according to three criteria: distance, creativity, and showmanship.

World records

Distance

The record for the longest flight is 258 feet (78.6 m), set on September 21, 2013, at the Flugtag in Long Beach, California by "The Chicken Whisperers" team in front of a crowd of 110,000.

Attendance

The largest crowd was in Cape Town, South Africa with 220,000 attending in 2012.

Results

International 

 Johannesburg, South Africa, 2000
 Auckland, New Zealand, 2002
 Winning team: Greatest American Hero
 Winning distance: 22 m
 Aircraft Description: Carbon fibre and mylar glider, pilot lying prone.
 Dubrovnik, Croatia, 2002
 Winning team: Stonebird
 Winning distance: 17.5 m
 Aircraft Description: Catapulted pilot
 Sukoro, Hungary, 2002
 Winning team: Yunyai
 Winning distance: 45.3 m
 Aircraft Description: human-powered aircraft
 Antwerp, Belgium, 2003
Tel Aviv, Israel, 2003
Winning team: The Dragon from The Yarkon
 Winning distance: 10.5 m
 Aircraft Description: Flying dragon
 London, United Kingdom, Sunday, August 3, 2003
 Hamburg, Germany, 2004
 Wellington, New Zealand, Sunday, March 14, 2004
 Winning team: Klinging On
 Winning distance: 23.5 m
 Aircraft Description: Starship Enterprise
 Prague, Czech Republic, Friday, June 25, 2006
 Winning team: Easy Money 3
 Winning distance: 30 m (98.4 ft)
 Aircraft Description: Wooden frame, Styrofoam and Fiberglass with all-moving tailplane
 Dubai, United Arab Emirates, 2005
 Winning team: Cre8tive 1
 Winning distance: 26 m
 Aircraft Description: Polystyrene and aluminum.
 Bratislava, Slovakia, Sunday, June 26, 2005
 Winning team: Red Arrows Brno
 Winning distance: 32 m (105 ft)
 Aircraft Description: Wooden frame, Polystyrene profiles, paper, all-moving ailerons
 Vancouver, British Columbia, Canada, 2006
 Winning team: The Big Shooter
 Winning distance: 26 m
 Aircraft Description: Kevlar, aluminum, titanium, carbon fiber and mylar.
 Rotterdam, Netherlands, 2006
 Winning team: Aquaphobia
 Winning distance: 30 m
 Aircraft Description: Aluminum sheets and wrapping plastic.
 São Paulo, Brazil, Sunday, September 17, 2006
 Local : Parque do Carmo
 Kuwait, Kuwait, Friday, November 2, 2007
 Winning team: The Flying Stars
 Winning distance: 12 m
 Dubai, United Arab Emirates, Friday, November 23, 2007
 Winning team: Snoopy vs. the Red Bull
 Winning distance: 21 m
 Aircraft Description: Styrofoam, cardboard and Fiberglass flying wing with canard
 Sydney, Australia, Sunday, April 6, 2008
 Winning team: Team Mullet
 Winning distance: 18.2 m
 Aircraft description: Giant Flounder on a fishing trawler (overall winners)
 Istanbul, Turkey, Sunday, May 25, 2008
 Winning team: Flying Turkeys
 Winning distance: 26.9 m
 Poznań, Poland, Sunday, June 1, 2008
 London, United Kingdom, Saturday, June 7, 2008
 Moscow, Russia, Sunday, August 9, 2009
 São Paulo, Brazil, Saturday, August 15, 2009
 Bogotá, Colombia, Sunday, September 14, 2008
 Winning team: Piragua del Aire
 Winning distance: 8 m
 Marseille, France, Sunday, September 27, 2009
 Winning team: Savonus vs Virus
 Winning distance: 23.0 m
 Aircraft description: Household soap ("Savon de Marseille" in French) on a huge facecloth.
 Kyiv, Ukraine, Saturday, June 19, 2010
 Winning team: Kuz'kina Mat'
 Winning distance: 12.0 m
 Aircraft description: The biplane with a cob of corn instead of the fuselage.
 Hong Kong, Sunday, October 10, 2010
 Kuwait, Kuwait, Friday, November 5, 2010
 Winning team: Dragonfly team
 Winning distance: 11 m (36.0 ft) by Divas team
 Aircraft description: Wood  & Polystyrene
 Dublin, Ireland, Sunday, May 22, 2011
 Tel Aviv, Israel, Friday, June 3, 2011
 Winning team: Arigami
 Winning distance: 21.0 m by Team Dumbo & Co.
 Aircraft description: Polystyrene and aluminum.
 Port of Spain, Trinidad and Tobago, Sunday, July 3, 2011
 Moscow, Russia, Sunday, August 7, 2011
 Cape Town, South Africa, 2012
 Vienna, Austria, 2012
 Mainz, Germany, Monday, May 28, 2012
 Winning team: Don Canallie und seine tollkühnen Schurken
 Winning distance: 69,79 m by Die Rückkehr der Teichfighter
 Aircraft description: Wooden Hang Glider
 Kuwait, Kuwait, Friday, October 19, 2012
 Winning team: Dragonfly team
 Winning distance: 18 m (59 ft)
 Aircraft description: Aluminum and Polystyrene
 Sentosa, Singapore, Saturday, October 28, 2012
 Jeddah, Saudi Arabia, Thursday, December 13, 2012
 Winning team: TeamSaher
 Winning distance: 25 m
 Aircraft description: Foam, Wood and Aluminum
 Istanbul, Turkey, Sunday, May 26, 2013
 Winning Team: Angara Börds
 Kyiv, Ukraine, Sunday, June 2, 2013
 Belgrade, Serbia, Saturday, June 22, 2013
 Winning team: Flyin’ figuar
 Winning distance: 19.59 m
 Aircraft description: Aluminium, Polyethilene, PVC
 Stockholm, Sweden, Sunday, June 30, 2013
 Moscow, Russia, Sunday, July 28, 2013
 Valparaíso, Chile, Saturday, February 8, 2014
 Hong Kong, Sunday, May 11, 2014
 Cascais, Portugal, Saturday, September 6, 2014
 Bangalore, India, Sunday, September 28, 2014
 Moscow, Russia, Sunday, July 26, 2015
 Gothenburg, Sweden, Saturday, August 22, 2015
 Oslo, Norway, Sunday, August 23, 2015
 Dubai, United Arab Emirates, Friday, November 27, 2015
 Milan, Italy, Sunday, June 19, 2016
 Lima, Peru, Saturday, June 25, 2016
 Varna, Bulgaria, Saturday, July 2, 2016
 Zürich, Switzerland, Saturday, July 16, 2016
 Hong Kong, Sunday, November 27, 2016
 Moscow, Russia, Sunday, August 13, 2017
 Dublin, Ireland, Sunday, May 20, 2018
 Winning Team: The Pink Panther
 Bremen, Germany, Sunday, July 1, 2018
 Sydney, Australia, Saturday, November 10, 2018
 Winning team: Chip off the Old Block
 Winning distance: 22m
 Belgrade, Serbia, Sunday, June 30, 2019
 Moscow, Russia, Sunday, July 28, 2019
 First Place: Time Flies
 Second Place: Nine Eggs
 Third Place: Universal Twine
 Istanbul, Turkey, Sunday, August 4, 2019
 First Place: Coffee Lovers (La Marzocco Turkey)
 Second Place: Mother Force
 Third Place: Vecihi Team
 Moscow, Russia, Sunday, summer 2021
 Lausanne, Switzerland, Sunday, September 19, 2021
 Vienna, Austria, 2021
 Winning team: Die Flügelmütter (member: Ribens, Tschesn King, Banbana, Dax)
 Winning distance:12 m
 Aircraft Description: Red Puch Maxi scale 3:1 with white paper angel wings. Material wood, carton
 Istanbul, Turkey, Sunday, August 14, 2022
 First Place: Red Kids On The Sky
 Second Place: Suuuus'hi Team
 Third Place: Air Kiss
Taichung, Taiwan, Sunday, September 18th, 2022 
 Winning team : 老闆，一個控肉刈包不加香菜不加肥肉 (member: 楊鎮濂, 徐寳璇, 黃俊穎, 蘇俊睿, 張東琳)
 Aircraft name : 好大刈(一ˋ)包
 Winning distance:32.75m
 Aircraft Description: Green wings
Auckland, New Zealand, Saturday, December 10th, 2022 
 First Place: Red Barren and Snoopy (formerly Greatest American Hero) (47m)
 Second Place: DC3
 Third Place: THE MO SHOW

United States 

 Austin, Texas, Saturday, April 26, 2003
 First Place: Pop and Fizz - 70 ft (21.3 m)
 Second Place: Team Acme
 Third Place: Winged Jalapeños
 Most Creative: El Sombrerians
 Chicago, Illinois, Saturday, August 9, 2003
 First Place: Sync, Swim or Fly - 51 ft (15.5 m)
 Second Place: Jake and Elwood
 Third Place: The Kicken' Chicken
 Most Creative: Candy Flyer
 Los Angeles, California, Saturday, September 20, 2003
 First Place: When Pigs Fly - 66 ft (20.1 m)
 Second Place: West Coast Flying Machines
 Third Place: The Marine Team
 Most Creative: Red Bull Slugger
 New York, New York, Sunday, October 5, 2003
 First Place: Pedal Power - 39 ft (11.9 m)
 Second Place: Mighty Whirl
 Third Place: Bammr's Ballistic Bedrock
 Most Creative: Urban Rodeo
 San Francisco, California, Saturday, October 25, 2003
 First Place: El Toro Guapo - 61 ft (18.6 m)
 Second Place: Project S.T.O.L.
 Third Place: Running of the Red Bulls
 Most Creative: Snoop's Dogg House
 Miami, Florida, Saturday, April 24, 2004
 First Place: The Resurrector - 33 ft (10.1 m)
 Second Place: Three Finger Salute
 Third Place: Believe It or Not (It's Just Me)
 Most Creative: Joy of Birth
 Portland, Oregon, Saturday, July 31, 2004
 First Place: 2004 X-Wing Glider - 39 ft (11.9 m)
 Second Place: Flying Wonka Bar
 Third Place: Oregon Santa Sleigh
 Most Creative: Hair Force One
 Cleveland, Ohio, Saturday, July 31, 2004
 First Place: Rover's Flying Glory - 63 ft (19.2 m)
 Second Place: Aerobus
 Third Place: The Stork
 Most Creative: Flying Musical Sensation
 Tempe, Arizona, Saturday, April 29, 2006
 First Place: The Need for Speed - 26 ft (7.9 m)
 Second Place: Air Farce One
 Third Place: El Vuelo Del Lobo
 Most Creative: Dipsomaniacal Devil
 People's Choice: El Vuelo Del Lobo
 Farthest Flight: El Vuelo Del Lobo
 Baltimore, Maryland, Saturday, October 21, 2006
 First Place: Victim's of Soi-cumstance - 81 ft (24.7 m)
 Second Place: Jump the Shark
 Third Place: F-10-75
 People's Choice: 4-4-0 American Flyer
 Nashville, Tennessee, Saturday, June 23, 2007
 First Place: Rocky Top Rocket - 155 ft (47.2 m)
 Second Place: No. 1 Lucky Flyer
 Third Place: Yellow Submarine
 People's Choice: Galapagos Flight Club
 Farthest Flight: Rocky Top Rocket
 Austin, Texas, Saturday, August 25, 2007
 First Place: Skate and Destroy
 Second Place: Superman's "Crip"tonite
 Third Place: Billy Ocean's Flying Fish Taco
 People's Choice: Congress Bridge Bats
 Tampa Bay, Florida, Saturday, July 19, 2008
 First Place: Team Tampa Baywatch - 109 ft (33.2 m)
 Second Place: Air Gilligan - 32 ft (9.8 m)
 Third Place: The Little Engine That Could - 21 ft (6.4 m)
 People's Choice: Tampa Bay Derby Darlins
 Portland, Oregon, Saturday, August 2, 2008
 First Place: Team Yakima Big Wheel - 62 ft (18.9 m)
 Second Place: Greased Lightning - 55 ft (16.8 m)
 Third Place: Free Ballin'
 People's Choice: Space Balls
 Chicago, Illinois, Saturday, September 6, 2008
 First Place: The Crustacean Avengers - 120 ft (36.6 m)
 Second Place: New Style Flyers - 75 ft (22.9 m)
 Third Place: Pie in the Sky! - 90 ft (27.4 m)
 People's Choice: The USHE
 Miami, Florida, Saturday, July 10, 2010
 First Place: Team Formula Flug - 53 ft (16.2 m)
 Second Place: Ibis Engineers
 Third Place: One Giant Leap
 People's Choice: Team TransPlace
 Saint Paul, Minnesota, Saturday, July 24, 2010
 First Place: Team Major Trouble and the Dirty Dixies from Inver Grove Heights - 207 ft (63.1 m)
 People's Choice:  Team FORE Play from West Des Moines, IA
 Long Beach, California, Saturday, August 21, 2010
 First Place: Team Peepin' It Real - 98 ft (29.9 m)
 Second Place: Green Machine
 Third Place: Airforce 1
 People's Choice: Green Army Men
 Philadelphia, Pennsylvania, Saturday, September 4, 2010
 Tampa, Florida, Saturday, October 8, 2011
 Miami, Florida, Saturday, November 3, 2012
 San Francisco, California, Saturday, November 10, 2012
 Chicago, Illinois, Saturday, September 21, 2013
 Dallas, Texas, Saturday, September 21, 2013
 Long Beach, California, Saturday, September 21, 2013
 First Place: The Chicken Whisperers - 258 ft (78.6 m)
 Miami, Florida, Saturday, September 21, 2013
 Washington, D.C., Saturday, September 21, 2013
 Portland, Oregon, Saturday, August 1, 2015
 Boston, Massachusetts, Saturday, August 20, 2016
 First Place: Flite-Riot
 Second Place: What Sphinx? (a Secret Boston team)
 Third Place: Something Wonderful
 People's Choice: Flite-Riot
 Louisville, Kentucky, Saturday, August 27, 2016
 First Place: MMMad MMMax
 Second Place: Dukes of Hazzardous by Kre8Now Makerspace - 82 ft (25.0 m)
 Third Place: Kentucky Power
 People's Choice: Mercy No Mercy - Mercy Academy
 Pittsburgh, Pennsylvania, Saturday, August 5, 2017
 First Place: Flight at the Roxbury - 78 ft (23.8 m)
 Second Place: Survivor Tractor - 121 ft (36.9 m)
 Third Place: Left Field Loonies
 People's Choice: The Flite Testers
 Nashville, Tennessee, Saturday, September 23, 2017
 First Place: Ground Control - 81 ft (24.7 m)
 Second Place: His Majesties Royal Circus and the Flying Irish Woman
 Third Place: YMCA
 People's Choice: Team Smashville
 St. Paul, Minnesota, Saturday, September 7, 2019
 First Place:  Spooners' Revenge - 54 ft (16.5 m)
 Second Place:  Ferris Bueler's Takeoff - 63 ft (19.2 m)
 Third Place:  Flying POS
 24 Hour Greatness Award:  Spooners' Revenge
 Milwaukee, WI, Saturday, July 16, 2022
 First Place:  Flight For Your Right to Party - 61 ft (18.9 m)
 Second Place:  
 Third Place:  Bear-Naked Chonkers
 People's Choice:  FLYING SCHMEAT

Incidents

Serious injuries
 Bucharest, September 19, 2010: broken back, skull fracture
 Pittsburgh, August 4, 2017: ruptured spleen, traumatic brain injury
 Nashville, September 23, 2017: Lumbar vertebrae (L1)

Cancellation/termination by authorities
 The Portland, Oregon, competition, held on August 1, 2015, at Tom McCall Waterfront Park, wherein craft were launched into the Willamette River, was ended early by the United States Coast Guard after an excessive number of spectator boats (over 500) filled the river, making it impassable to commercial traffic.  One collision was reported between a spectator boat and a commercial vessel, though damage was minimal and no injuries occurred.

In video games
The Red Bull Flugtag is featured as a playable mini-game in a special "Red Bull space", called the Red Bull Beach, in PlayStation Home released on November 26, 2009.

See also
 International Birdman

Notes

References
 "The History of Flugtag." 1st Red Bull Flugtag Sydney. Red Bull. 14 Apr. 2008: .
 "Events." Red Bull Flugtag USA. Red Bull. 2 Aug. 2008: .
 "What is Flugtag?" Red Bull Flugtag USA. Red Bull. 2 Aug. 2008: .

External links

 Roundhay Park Leeds UK
 LONDON PIXELS London Flugtag 2008 Photo set 
 www.redbullflugtag.hk
 http://redbullflugtag.se
 http://www.redbull.com/flightlab
 https://web.archive.org/web/20080922004420/http://www.redbullflugtag.at/
 http://www.redbullflugtag.com.au
 http://www.redbullflugtagusa.com
 https://web.archive.org/web/20030809102902/http://www.redbullflugtag.co.uk/
 http://www.redbullflugtag.ae
 http://www.redbullflugtag.com.br
 
 http://www.airplix.com
 https://web.archive.org/web/20110714170032/http://www.netnewspublisher.com/more-than-80000-turn-up-for-the-red-bull-flugtag-in-portland-oregon/
 https://web.archive.org/web/20090930183313/http://www.redbullflugtag.fr/
 https://web.archive.org/web/20100722033255/http://www.redbullflugtag.ro/
 https://web.archive.org/web/20110610220355/http://www.redbull.co.il/cs/Satellite/he_IL/Red-Bull-Flugtag/001242937177311
 https://tnflugtag.com

Aviation competitions and awards
Mechanical engineering competitions
Recurring events established in 1991
Flugtag
Webby Award winners
Articles containing video clips